The national flag of Russia, also known as the State Flag of the Russian Federation, is a tricolour flag consisting of three equal horizontal fields: white on the top, blue in the middle, and red on the bottom. The flag was first used as an ensign for Russian merchant ships in 1696.

It remained in use until 1858, when the first official flag of the Russian Empire was decreed by Alexander II, which was a tricolour consisting of three horizontal fields: black on the top, yellow in the middle, and white on the bottom. A decree in 1896 reinstated the white, blue, and red tricolour as the official flag of the Russian Empire until 1917.

Following the creation of the Russian Socialist Federative Soviet Republic after the Bolshevik Revolution, the Russian tricolour was abolished, but its usage was preserved by the White Movement and the Russian state during the Russian Civil War. During the Soviet Union's existence, the country used the red flag with a golden hammer and sickle and a golden bordered red star on top, while the Russian SFSR, as the founding republic, used a defaced variant with a vertical blue bar at the hoist.

During the dissolution of the Soviet Union, after the 1991 August Coup, the Russian SFSR adopted a new flag design similar to the pre-revolutionary tricolour that had been abolished in 1917. The ratio of the new flag was 1:2, and the flag colours consisted of white on the top, blue in the middle, and red on the bottom. When Boris Yeltsin made the State Heraldic Register, he gave the flag the number 1 there. The flag design remained the same until 1993, when the original Russian tricolour was fully restored as the current flag after the 1993 Russian constitutional crisis. The current flag is listed at number 2 in the SHR.

Origin 
Two accounts of the flag's origin connect it to the tricolour used by the Dutch Republic (the flag of the Netherlands).

The earliest mention of the flag occurs during the reign of Alexis I, in 1668, and is related to the construction of the first Russian naval ship, the frigate Oryol. According to one source, the ship's Dutch lead engineer Butler faced the need for the flag, and issued a request to the Boyar Duma, to "ask His Royal Majesty as to which (as is the custom among other nations) flag shall be raised on the ship". The official response merely indicated that, as such issue is as yet unprecedented, even though the land forces do use (apparently different) flags, the tsar ordered that his (Butler's) opinion be sought about the matter, asking specifically as to the custom existing in his country.

A different account traces the origins of the Russian flag to tsar Peter the Great's visits to Arkhangelsk in 1693 and 1694. Peter was keenly interested in shipbuilding in the European style, different from the barges ordinarily used in Russia at the time. In 1693, Peter had ordered a Dutch-built frigate from Amsterdam. In 1694 when it arrived, the Dutch red, white, and blue banner flew from its stern. Peter decided to model Russia's naval flag after that banner by assigning meaning and reordering the colours.

The Dutch flag book of 1695 by Carel Allard, printed only a year after Peter's trip to Western Europe, describes the tricolour with a double-headed eagle bearing a shield on its breast and wearing a golden crown over both of its heads.

History 

A study on clarifying the national colours of Russia based on disquisition on documents of the Moscow Archive of Ministry of Justice of the Russian Empire was summarized by Dmitry Samokvasov, a Russian archaeologist and legal historian, in an edition of 16 pages called "On the Question of National Colours of Ancient Russia" published in Moscow in 1910.

1552–1918: Tsardom, Empire and Republic

In 1552, Russian regiments marched on the victorious assault of Kazan under Ivan the Terrible with the banner of the Most Gracious Saviour. For the next century and a half, the banner of Ivan the Terrible accompanied the Russian army. Under Tsarina Sophia Alekseevna, it visited the Crimean campaigns, and under Peter the Great, the Azov campaigns and the Russo-Swedish War.

In the Illustrated Chronicle of Ivan the Terrible, there is an image of the banner of Ivan the Terrible in the Kazan campaign – a bifurcated white one with the image of the Saviour and an eight-pointed cross above it. According to other sources, the banner was red instead of white. A copy of this banner, which has been restored many times, is still kept in the Kremlin Armoury.

In 1612, the Nizhny Novgorod militia raised the banner of Dmitry Pozharsky, it was crimson in colour with the image of the Lord Almighty on one side and the archangel Michael on the other.

In 1669, the Polish painters Stanislav Loputsky and Ivan Mirovsky invited by Tsar Alexis of Russia, painted for the tsar's palace in Kolomenskoye "the hallmarks (that is, the emblems) of the sovereigns and all the universal states of this world." Then Loputsky drew "on the canvas, the coat of arms of the Moscow State and the arms of other neighbouring countries, under every emblem of the planet under which they are." The coat of arms was a white rectangular banner with a "slope" and a wide red border, in the centre of which was depicted a gold two-headed eagle and the emblems symbolizing the subject kingdoms, principalities and lands. In the inventory of the Kremlin Armoury, the coat of arms is described as the following: "In the circle there is a two-headed eagle wearing two crowns, and in his chest, the king on horseback pricks a serpent with his spear".

On 6 August 1693, during Peter the Great's sailing in the White Sea with a detachment of warships built in Arkhangelsk, the so-called "Flag of the Tsar of Muscovy" was raised for the first time on the 12-gun yacht "Saint Peter". The flag was a cross-stitch of 4.6x4.9 meters sewn from cloth, composed of three equal-sized horizontal stripes of white, blue and red, with a golden double-headed eagle in the middle. The original of this oldest surviving Russian flag is located in the Central Naval Museum in Saint Petersburg.

A 1695 flag book by Carel Allard describes three flags used by the tsar of Muscovy: the tricolour with the double-headed eagle bearing a shield on its breast and wearing a golden crown over both of its heads, the same tricolour with a blue saltire over it, and a cross flag showing red and white quartering with a blue cross over all. The cross flag is depicted upon the Construction of Kronschloss Medal, which commemorates the construction of Fort Kronschlot (Kronschloss) in Kronstadt by Peter the Great in 1704, the colours of the flag being determined according to the hatchings engraved.

The armorial banner of Peter the Great was created in 1696. Made from red taffeta with a white border, the flag depicted a golden eagle hovering over the sea. On the chest of the eagle in the circle is the Saviour, next to the Holy Spirit and the Holy Apostles Peter and Paul. The banner was likely made for the second Azov campaign.

In 1693, Franz Timmerman received the order to build merchant ships in Arkhangelsk and trade with Europe. He was told to display the two-headed eagle spread with wings, with three crowns over it. On the chest of the eagle, a warrior on horseback was to be displayed with a spear, in a military harness. The same eagle was also to hold a sceptre with the right leg and an apple with a crest with the left. The same instructions were given to other traders.

According to Dutch newspapers, in June 1694, a 44-gun frigate bought by Russia and built in Rotterdam stood in the Amsterdam roadstead under the white-blue-red flag.

In 1696, at the mouth of the river Don, a Russian flotilla of armed rowboats blocked the supply of the Ottoman fortress of Azov. On the 1700 engraving by Adrian Shkhonebek, Taking the fortress of Azov. 1696, depicts the ships carrying rectangular panels on the flagpoles, the heraldic shading of which shows that some of the flags are blue with a straight red cross, and the rest are white with a straight red cross. A number of researchers doubt the accuracy of Shkonebek's engraving because he was not a witness to the events.

Images of various white-blue-red Russian flags are present in the three later paintings of Abraham Storck's workshop dedicated to the arrival in Amsterdam of Peter I. Peter I took part in a practice battle on the river IJ while on board the yacht of the Dutch East India Company. In the paintings of Abraham Stork depicting the show fight, this yacht sails under the white-blue-red flag with a double-headed eagle, or under a white-red-blue pennant and a white-red-blue aft flag with a double-headed eagle.

In October 1699, Peter I, on the back of the sheet with instructions sent to the Russian envoy Yemelyan Ukraintsev in Istanbul, drew a sketch of a three-band white-blue-red flag.

In December 1699, the Austrian ambassador Anton Paleyer gave a list of weapons and flags seen on the vessels of the Azov Flotilla in a letter. He described seeing three small flags of white-red-blue colours and two regimental colours of red and white mixed in with other colours.

In April 1700, Peter I ordered the Kremlin Armoury to build white-red-violet sea banners. The design and dimensions of these banners correspond to the figure and the size of the regimental banner kept among the other 352 trophy Russian banners in the burial vault of Swedish kings – the Riddarholm Church in Stockholm.

The three-band white-blue-red flag, as well as the flag with a red Jerusalem cross, were also used on warships up to 1720 as signals.

The Russian tricolour flag was adopted as a merchant flag at rivers in 1705. These colours of the flag of Russia would later inspire the choice of the "Pan-Slavic colours" by the Prague Slavic Congress, 1848. Two other Slavic countries, Slovakia and Slovenia, have flags similar to the Russian one, but with added coats-of-arms for differentiation. On 7 May 1883, the Russian flag was authorized to be used on land, and it became an official National flag before the coronation of Tsar Nicholas II in 1896. 

The flag continued to be used by the Russian Provisional Government after the [Tsar]] Nicholas abdicated during the February Revolution and was not replaced until the October Revolution which established the Russian Socialist Federative Soviet Republic.

1918–1991: Civil War and Soviet Union (USSR)

On 8 April 1918, the flag of the Russian Soviet Federative Socialist Republic was discussed at a meeting of the Council of People's Commissars of the RSFSR. The Council proposed that the All-Russian Central Executive Committee create a red flag with the abbreviation for the phrase Workers of the world, unite! However, the proposal was not adopted. On 13 April 1918, the All-Russian Central Executive Committee established the RSFSR flag to be a red banner with the inscription Russian Socialist Federative Soviet Republic. The text of the decree did not contain any clarification regarding the colour, size and location of the inscription, or the width and length ratio of the cloth.

On 17 June 1918, the All-Russian Central Executive Committee approved a sample image of the flag of the RSFSR, developed on behalf of the People's Commissariat for Foreign Affairs of the Russian SFSR by the graphic artist Sergey Chekhonin. The flag was a red rectangular panel, in the upper corner of which was placed the inscription RSFSR in gold letters stylized as Slavic. This inscription was separated from the rest of the cloth on both sides by gold stripes forming a rectangle.

On 30 December 1922, the RSFSR combined with the Ukrainian SSR, Byelorussian SSR, and Transcaucasian SFSR to form the Soviet Union. The national flag of the USSR was established on 18 April 1924, described in the Constitution of the USSR as a red or scarlet rectangular cloth with a 1:2 width to length ratio, with a gold sickle and hammer in the top corner next to the flagpole and a red five-pointed star framed with a golden border. This flag was carried by all ships of the USSR and diplomatic representations of the USSR. The 1:2 red flag was used, until replaced in 1954 with the universal design of the Soviet flag with a blue stripe along the mast.

Contrary to the belief that the USSR state flag outranked the flag of the RSFSR, the actual use of the USSR flag was limited. The USSR flag in Russia flew only over two buildings, that of the Central Executive Committee of the Soviet Union and the Council of People's Commissars. That decision was adopted on 23 March 1925, also establishing that the flag of the RSFSR had to be raised constantly not only on the buildings of the Central Executive Committee and the Council of People's Commissars but also on the buildings of all local soviets, including village soviets and district soviets in cities. On holidays, the RSFSR flag had to be raised on many public buildings (such as schools, hospitals, and government offices).

During the Second World War, the white-blue-red tricolour was used by German collaborators, most of whom were from groups targeted by the repressions of the Stalin era, including anti-communist Christians and the remnants of the Kulaks, who generally regarded the German invasion as a liberation of Russia from communism. 

On 20 January 1947, the Presidium of the Supreme Soviet of the USSR found it necessary to amend the national flags of the allied republics so that the flags reflected the idea of a Soviet Union state as well as the unique national identities of the republics. On each of the flags was placed the emblem of the USSR, a sickle and a hammer with a red five-pointed star, with the inclusion of national ornaments and new colours. The new RSFSR flag was established in January 1954: a red rectangular panel with a light blue strip near the pole running the full width of the flag. In the upper left corner of the red canvas were depicted a golden sickle and a hammer and above them a red five-pointed star framed with a golden border. By the Law of the RSFSR of 2 June 1954, this flag was approved and the description of the flag was included in Article 149 of the Constitution of the RSFSR.

1991–present: Russian Federation

During the dissolution of the Soviet Union, after the 1991 August Coup, the Russian SFSR adopted a new flag design similar to the pre-revolutionary tricolour that had been abolished in 1917. The ratio of the new flag was 1:2, and the flag colours consisted of white on the top, blue in the middle, and red on the bottom. The flag design remained the same until 1993, when the original Russian tricolour was fully restored as the current flag after the 1993 Russian constitutional crisis. Following the events of the attempted coup in Moscow, the supreme soviet of the Russian SFSR declared, by resolution dated 22 August 1991, that the old imperial tricolour flag serve as the national flag of the state. The constitution was subsequently amended by Law No. 1827-1 1 November 1991. At the disintegration of the USSR on 25 December 1991, the Soviet flag was lowered from Kremlin and then replaced by the tricolour flag. 

The modern era flag underwent a proportion change from 1:2 to 2:3 in 1993 and has been most recently provided for by a 2000 law. On 11 December 1993, President of the Russian Federation Boris Yeltsin signed Decree No. 2126 "On the State Flag of the Russian Federation". In Article 1 of the decree, the flag was described as a "rectangular panel of three equal horizontal stripes: the top – white, middle – blue, and bottom – red, with a width to length ratio of 2:3."

The National Flag Day is an official holiday in Russia, established in 1994. It is celebrated on 22 August, the day of the victory over putschists in 1991, but employees remain at work.

Symbolism 
At the times of Alexander III of Russia the official interpretation was as follows: the white color symbolizes nobility and frankness; the blue for faithfulness, honesty, impeccability, and chastity; and the red for courage, generosity, and love. A common unofficial interpretation was: Red: Great Russia, White: White Russia, Blue: Little Russia.

Regulations 
When the Russian flag and the flags of the Russian federal subjects are flown at the same time, the national flag should be:

 on the left if two flags are raised
 in the middle if the number of flags is odd
 and to the left of the centre if the number is even

The flag cannot be smaller, or lower than a regional flag.

Colour specifications 

Federal constitutional law of the Russian Federation only says that the colours of the flag are "white", "blue" (синий, or dark blue, as Russian has two colours that are called "blue" in English), and "red". The Federal Constitutional Law on the State Flag of the Russian Federation does not actually specify which shades the colours should be. Russian government agencies when ordering the manufacture of cloth for the flag indicate the following Pantone colours: white, blue (Pantone 286C), and red (Pantone 485C).

Colour specifications for different colour shades 

The album of national flags, published by the Hydrographic and Oceanographic Service of the Russian Navy, gives the following shades of colours of the flag of Russia in Pantone:

The colours following are for the old, Post-Soviet flag of Russia:

Variant versions

A variant of the flag was authorized for private use by Tsar Nicholas II before World War I, adding the large state eagle on a yellow field (imperial standard) in the canton. It has never been used as the official state flag. Likewise, today some Russian people may use another variant of the flag defaced with the double-headed eagle from the coat of arms in the middle and the golden word РОССИЯ at the bottom.

After the October Revolution of 1917, the tricolour design was banned, and a definitive new flag of the Russian SFSR was introduced in 1954 (see flag of the Russian SFSR), and this remained the republic's flag until the collapse of the Soviet Union in 1991. All of the Soviet republics' flags were created by introducing a small but noticeable change to the flag of the Soviet Union. For Russia, the change was an introduction of the left-hand blue band. The previous Soviet design was different, a plain red flag with different variants of the "RSFSR" abbreviation in the canton. Today, the Soviet flag is used by the supporters and members of the Communist Party of the Russian Federation.

The tricolour was used by the anticommunist forces during the Civil War called the White movement. It was continued to be used by White émigrés in various countries as the Russian flag. The tricolour was associated both in Soviet Russia as well as the Russian White emigre communities as symbolizing a traditional tsarist Orthodox Russia. This flag can be seen inside a few Orthodox churches in the West established by the Russian communities. In the Soviet Union, the tricolour  was used in films set in the pre-revolutionary period and was seen as a historical flag, especially after the 1940s.

It, rather than the black-yellow-white colour combination, was readopted by Russia on 22 August 1991. That date is celebrated yearly as the national flag day.

The President of Russia uses a Presidential Standard, which was introduced via Presidential Decree No.319 on 15 February 1994, it is officially defined as the square tricolour with the coat of arms (in this case the double-headed eagle is depicted without the shield) in the middle.

Unicode

See also

 Coat of arms of Moscow
 Coat of arms of Russia
 Flags of the federal subjects of Russia
 List of Russian flags
 Flag of the Russian-American Company
 Pan-Slavic colours
 Flag of Bulgaria (nearly identical design, green stripe instead of blue)
 Flag of Dagestan (nearly identical design, green stripe instead of white)
 Flag of the Donetsk People's Republic (nearly identical design, black stripe instead of white)
 Flag of Colombia (nearly identical design, yellow stripe instead of white)
 Flag of the Luhansk People's Republic (nearly identical design, turquoise stripe instead of white) 
 Flag of Slovakia (nearly identical design, defaced with the coat of arms at the hoist side)
 Flag of Slovenia (nearly identical design, defaced with the coat of arms at the hoist side)
 Flag of Transnistria
 White-blue-white flag (variant used by anti-war protesters against the invasion of Ukraine)

Notes

References

External links

 Official image of the Russian flag, on the official site of the Russian President
 Federal Constitutional Law of 25 December 2000 No. 1-FKZ "On the State Flag of the Russian Federation" (including amendments). pravo.gov.ru  
 Timeline Russian National Flag 
 Flag of Russia – old link 
 Flag of Russia – Vexillographia 
 Flag of Russia 
 National Flag and Naval Ensign in Russia Navy 

 
Russia
National symbols of Russia